Dooks railway station was on the Great Southern and Western Railway which ran from Farranfore to Valentia Harbour in the Republic of Ireland. Trains were not able to pass at this station on the single track line.

History

The station was opened on 1 May 1897.

In the 1954 timetable the station was listed as Dooks Halt and some trains had to be requested to stop by signalled request.

The station closed on 1 February 1960.

References 

 

Disused railway stations in County Kerry
Railway stations opened in 1897
Railway stations closed in 1960
Farranfore–Valentia Harbour line